The 2000 Qatar Open, known as the 2000 Qatar ExxonMobil Open for sponsorship reasons,  was a men's tennis tournament held in Doha, Qatar and played on outdoor hard courts. The event was part of the International Series of the 2000 ATP Tour. It was the eighth edition of the tournament and was held from 3 January through 10 January 2000. Third-seeded Fabrice Santoro won the singles title.

Finals

Singles

 Fabrice Santoro defeated  Rainer Schüttler, 3–6, 7–5, 3–0 ret.

Doubles

 Mark Knowles /  Max Mirnyi defeated  Alex O'Brien /  Jared Palmer, 6–3, 6–4

References

 
Qatar Open
2000 in Qatari sport
Qatar Open (tennis)